On Line is a 2015 Chinese science fiction action film directed by Li Changxin. It was released on January 30, 2015.

Cast
Liu Mengmeng
Li Ning
Kang Enhe
Zhang Weixun
Luo Guangmin
Tong Yang
Du Yifei

Reception
By January 30, the film had earned  at the Chinese box office.

References

2015 science fiction action films
Chinese science fiction action films
2010s Mandarin-language films